Beautiful World is the sixth solo studio album by the English singer-songwriter Paul Carrack, then a member of the supergroup Mike + The Mechanics. It was originally released in 1997 on the Ark 21 label.

Album co-producer Gary Wallis was the drummer for Mike + The Mechanics at the time the album was issued, though he was at that juncture a session player and not an official member of the Mechanics.  Wallis would join the revived version of Mike + The Mechanics as an official member in 2011, long after Carrack had left that group.

The album was a minor chart entry on the UK album charts, reaching #88.  The album's associated single, "The Way I'm Feeling Tonight", peaked at #84 UK.

Reception

AllMusic's Stephen Thomas Erlewine writes: "Beautiful World is a thoroughly enjoyable collection of polished, mature pop-soul that is another fine addition to Paul Carrack's catalog."

Track listing

Personnel 
Credits are adapted from the album's liner notes.
 Paul Carrack – vocals, keyboards, Hammond organ
 Toby Chapman – keyboards, additional programming, backing vocals
 Tim Renwick – guitars
 Dave Bronze – bass, backing vocals
 Gary Wallis – drums, drum programming, additional programming
 Mark Feltham – harmonica solo (6)
 Tessa Niles – backing vocals (1-7, 9, 10)
 Tommy Blaize – backing vocals (3)
 Claudia Fontaine – backing vocals (3)
 Beverley Skeete – backing vocals (3)
 Paul Williamson – backing vocals (3)

Production 
 Toby Chapman – producer 
 Gary Wallis – producer 
 Andy Jackson – recording engineer, mixing (8) 
 André Horstmann – assistant engineer
 John Brough – mixing (1-7, 9-12)
 Ray Staff – mastering 
 Steve Tannett – A&R 
 John Carver – art direction, chair
 The Leisure Process Studio – sleeve design 

Studios
 Recorded at Haflaga Studios
 Mixed at The Pierce Rooms (London, UK).
 Mastered at Whitfield Street Studios (London, UK).

References

External links

1997 albums
Paul Carrack albums